Larry Johnson (born July 25, 1959) is an American artist living and working in Los Angeles.  Johnson uses a combination of contemporary and antiquated photographic techniques.

Early life and career 
Larry Johnson was raised in the Middle American town of Lakewood. He was born on July 25, 1959, to his father, a AAA baseball player, and his mother, a homemaker.  Johnson began studying at the California Institute of the Arts (CalArts) in 1978 and graduated in 1982 with a Bachelor of Fine Arts. He stayed with the school and went on to receive a Masters of Fine Arts in 1984. While studying at CalArts Johnson mentored under Douglas Huebler and worked alongside fellow students Stephen Prina and Christopher Williams. During this time he also met Richard Prince, who visited the institute in 1984. Johnson cites Prince as an early influence on his work and credits the meeting as leading to his inclusion in his first New York exhibition, the 1987  "Perverted by Language" curated by Robert Nickas.

Career and artwork

Teaching 
Johnson has taught as a professor in Los Angeles for approximately thirty years and at one time served as the chair of the Otis College of Art and Design's department of Photography.  He is currently a Distinguished Lecturer at Otis as well as an occasional guest lecturer at ArtCenter.

Work and techniques  
Johnson was trained in pre-digital commercial graphic design production and often foregrounds techniques such as the paste-up, commonly used to prepare “camera ready” material for print.

Exhibitions

Selected solo exhibitions 

 2016: MAMCO, Geneva, Switzerland
 2015: On Location, Raven Row, London, UK
 2009: Hammer Museum, Los Angeles, CA

Selected exhibitions with others 

 2020: Made in LA: a version, Hammer Museum, Los Angeles CA
 2019: Larry Johnson & Asha Schechter, Jenny's, Los Angeles, CA
 2009: MOCA's First Thirty Years, The Museum of Contemporary Art, Los Angeles, CA
 2004:  Forest of Signs, Museum of Contemporary Art, Los Angeles, CA
 1991: Whitney Biennial, Whitney Museum of American Art, New York, NY
 1989: California Photography: Remaking Make-Believe, The Museum of Modern Art, New York, NY; Aspen Art Museum, Aspen, CO
 1988: XLIII Esposizione Internazionale d'Arte, La Biennale di Venezia, Venice, Italy
 1987: On View, New Museum of Contemporary Art, New York, NY
 1987: Documenta 8, Kassel, Germany

Public and museum collections 

 Los Angeles County Museum of Art, Los Angeles, CA
 Art Institute of Chicago, Chicago, IL
 Denver Art Museum, Denver, CO
 Dallas Museum of Art, Dallas, TX
 Hammer Museum, Los Angeles, CA
 MAMCO, Geneva, Switzerland
 Museum of Contemporary Art, Los Angeles, CA
 Museum of Modern Art, New York, NY
 Whitney Museum, New York, NY

Books 

 Larry Johnson: Commie Pinko Guy Edited by Bruce Hainley. Texts by Morgan Fisher, Bruce Hainley, Antony Hudek, Larry Johnson, Wayne Koestenbaum, Lisa Lapinski, Pleasant Gehman, James McCourt, Boyd McDonald, Duncan Smith, Koenig Books, 2015
 Larry Johnson (Monograph) Essays by Russell Ferguson, Lee Edelman, and Esther Leslie, and an interview with the artist by David Rimanelli. Hammer Publications, 2007
 Larry Johnson Edited by Sherri Schottlaender. Texts by Scott Watson, Laurence A. Rickels and Gary Indiana. Published by the Morris and Helen Belkin Art Gallery at The University of British Columbia, Vancouver, 1996

References 

1959 births
Artists from Los Angeles

Living people